Noël Geneste (born 17 December 1947) is a French former racing cyclist. He rode in the 1973 Tour de France.

References

External links
 

1947 births
Living people
French male cyclists
People from Cusset
Sportspeople from Allier
Cyclists from Auvergne-Rhône-Alpes